Kamarhati Assembly constituency is an assembly constituency in North 24 Parganas district in the Indian state of West Bengal.

Overview
As per orders of the Delimitation Commission, No. 112 Kamarhati Assembly constituency is composed of the following: Ward Nos. 1 to 16 and 21 to 35 of Kamarhati municipality.

Kamarhati Assembly constituency is part of No. 16 Dum Dum (Lok Sabha constituency).

Members of Legislative Assembly

Election results

2021

2016
In the 2016 election, Manas Mukherjee of CPI(M) defeated his nearest rival Madan Mitra of Trinamool Congress.

2011
In the 2011 election, Madan Mitra of Trinamool Congress defeated his nearest rival Manas Mukherjee of CPI(M).

.# Swing calculated on Congress+Trinamool Congress vote percentages taken together in 2006.

1977-2006
In the 2006 and 2001 state assembly elections Manash Mukherjee of CPI(M), won from the Kamarhati assembly seat defeating his nearest rivals Subhrangshu Bhattacharya of Trinamool Congress in 2006 and Chittaranjan Bag of Trinamool Congress in 2001. Contests in most years were multi cornered but only winners and runners are being mentioned. Santi Ghatak of CPI(M) had won it in 1996 and in 1991 defeating his nearest rivals Sambhunath Dutta of Congress  in 1996 and Salil Biswas of Congress in 1991. Radhika Ranjan Bannerjee of CPI(M) had won this seat in 1987, 1982, and in 1977defeating Ajoy Ghosal of Congress in 1987, Purnendu Bimal Dutta of Congress in 1982 and Jayanta Chandra Sen of Congress in 1977.

1967-1972
Pradip Kumar Palit of Congress won in 1972. Radhika Ranjan Banerjee of CPI(M) won in 1971, 1969 and in 1967. Prior to that the Kamarhati seat did not exist.

References

Assembly constituencies of West Bengal
Politics of North 24 Parganas district